Charles Maidment (1844–1926) was a British jockey, prominent in the early 1870s.

He was joint British Champion jockey in two successive years, 1870 and 1871, although is generally regarded as inferior to other jockeys of the time such as George Fordham and Tom Cannon, Sr.  Besides his Championships, his main achievement was winning the Fillies' Triple Crown on Hannah in 1871.

He mainly rode for trainer Joseph Hayhoe and his major owners, Baron Meyer de Rothschild and Alexander and Hector Baltazzi.  He retired in 1891 and was forced by financial circumstance to ride out for Newmarket stables until old age.

Classic race victories
 Great Britain
 1,000 Guineas - Hannah (1871)
 Epsom Oaks - Hannah (1871)
 Epsom Derby - Cremorne (1872), Kisber (1876)
 St. Leger - Hannah (1871), Wenlock (1872)

References

Bibliography
  

British Champion flat jockeys
British jockeys
1844 births
1926 deaths